Tom Billeter (born February 12, 1961) is an American college basketball coach, currently the head coach at Augustana University in Sioux Falls, South Dakota. He previously has been the head coach at North Dakota State University, as well as holding assistant coaching roles at a number of NCAA Division I colleges. He led Augustana to the 2016 NCAA Division II national championship and was named the national coach of the year in that season.

Billeter is from Byron, Illinois and obtained his undergraduate degree from the University of Illinois at Urbana–Champaign. He began his coaching career as a high school coach, then made his entry into college coaching as an assistant to Lute Olson at Arizona. He then moved to Rice under Scott Thompson. He was hired as head coach of then-Division II North Dakota State, where he led the Bison to four consecutive 20-win seasons in his five seasons at the helm (from 1992 to 1997). He left the school, despite his success, to take an assistant coaching job at high profile Division I program St. John's.

After a year at St. John's, then five seasons as an assistant at Texas A&M, Billeter was hired as head coach at Augustana in 2003. After going 42–69 in his first four seasons, he then led the Vikings to three consecutive NCAA Tournament appearances from 2008 to 2010. Billeter received the Clarence Gaines Coach of the Year award in 2013. In the 2014–15 season, the Vikings went 31–3 but were knocked out of the 2015 NCAA tournament by Northwest Missouri in the second round. The Vikings avenged the loss the following season as they went 34–2 behind national player of the year Dan Jansen and won the school's first national championship. Billeter was named the national Division II coach of the year by the National Association of Basketball Coaches (NABC) at the conclusion of the season.

On January 26, 2019, Billeter won his 300th game as Augustana Vikings coach.

College coaching record

References

External links
Augustana Vikings bio
2016 National Champions retrospective

1961 births
Living people
American men's basketball coaches
Arizona Wildcats men's basketball coaches
Augustana (South Dakota) Vikings men's basketball coaches
Basketball coaches from Illinois
College men's basketball head coaches in the United States
High school basketball coaches in the United States
North Dakota State Bison men's basketball coaches
People from Byron, Illinois
Rice Owls men's basketball coaches
St. John's Red Storm men's basketball coaches
Texas A&M Aggies men's basketball coaches
University of Arizona alumni
University of Illinois Urbana-Champaign alumni